Vehbi Akdağ (1 January 1949 – 23 June 2020) was a Turkish wrestler and Olympic silver medalist in Freestyle wrestling.

Akdağ competed at the 1972 Summer Olympics in Munich where he received a silver medal in featherweight class in Freestyle wrestling

References

External links
 

1949 births
2020 deaths
Olympic wrestlers of Turkey
Wrestlers at the 1968 Summer Olympics
Wrestlers at the 1972 Summer Olympics
Wrestlers at the 1976 Summer Olympics
Turkish male sport wrestlers
Olympic silver medalists for Turkey
Olympic medalists in wrestling
World Wrestling Championships medalists
Medalists at the 1972 Summer Olympics
20th-century Turkish people
21st-century Turkish people